Komlan Amewou (born 15 December 1983 is a Togolese former professional footballer who played as a midfielder.

Club career
Amewou was born in Lomé, Togo. In January 2008 he moved from Togo-based club OC Agaza to Norwegian club Strømsgodset IF. Before moving back to Togo he was one of the best midfielders in Ghana, he played for Heart of Lions in Kpandu.

On 11 June 2010, the French Ligue 2 club Nîmes Olympique signed the Togolese midfielder on a three-year contract, he joined for an undisclosed fee from Strømsgodset IF.

International career
Amewou was a member of the Togo national team.

In 2013 he played in all matches at 2013 Africa Cup of Nations where his team reached the quarter-finals.

International goals
Scores and results list Togo's goal tally first, score column indicates score after Amewou goal.

Notes

1983 births
Living people
Sportspeople from Lomé
Togolese footballers
Association football midfielders
Togo international footballers
2010 Africa Cup of Nations players
2013 Africa Cup of Nations players
Eliteserien players
Ligue 2 players
Championnat National players
Libyan Premier League players
Heart of Lions F.C. players
FC Gloria Buzău players
Olympic Azzaweya SC players
OC Agaza players
Strømsgodset Toppfotball players
Nîmes Olympique players
Al-Shaab CSC players
Sur SC players
UAE First Division League players
Togolese expatriate footballers
Togolese expatriate sportspeople in Ghana
Expatriate footballers in Ghana
Togolese expatriate sportspeople in Libya
Expatriate footballers in Libya
Togolese expatriate sportspeople in Romania
Expatriate footballers in Romania
Togolese expatriate sportspeople in Norway
Expatriate footballers in Norway
Togolese expatriate sportspeople in France
Expatriate footballers in France
Expatriate footballers in the United Arab Emirates
Togolese expatriate sportspeople in Oman
Expatriate footballers in Oman
21st-century Togolese people